The Indian swellshark (Cephaloscyllium silasi) is a catshark of the family Scyliorhinidae found in the western Indian Ocean from Quilon, India and Sauqira Bay, Oman  between latitudes 16° N and 10° N, from the surface to 300 m. It grows to about 36 cm in length, and can expand its body by taking in air or water to make it appear larger to predators.

Biology 
Cephaloscyllium silasi is a single oviparous species and possibly attains a maximum size of 500 mm  in total length. Length at maturity of males reported as 367 mm. Females have egg cases, which carry their young ones in the uterus, usually each egg cases in two uteri of the female shark with attached yolk.

Feeding 
Cephaloscyllium silasi, feeds on Crustaceans and cephalopods

References

 

Cephaloscyllium
Fish described in 1974